Pachodynerus carpenteri  is a potter wasp classified in the family Vespidae, subfamily Eumeninae, native to Mexico, Colombia and Venezuela.

References

Potter wasps
Insects described in 1998
Hymenoptera of South America